The Schoolhouse Children's Museum & Learning Center is located in a historic school building, the Boynton School (also known as the Boynton Beach Elementary School), at 129 East Ocean Avenue in Boynton Beach, Palm Beach County, Florida.

The school
The school was built in 1913, replacing a one-room school on the same site. Designer was West Palm Beach architect William Maughlin. It has two floors and six classrooms, and housed 12 grades. It was Boynton Beach's only school for 14 years. This was a "whites only" school until the integration of Florida schools in the 1960s.

In 1927 a high school was built next door, and this building became an elementary school. Electricity and indoor plumbing were installed at that time.

In 1990 the Boynton Elementary School closed, though the building continued to be used for community programs. On March 7, 1994, it was added to the U.S. National Register of Historic Places.

In the 1990s the former school was the cornerstone of a revival of downtown Boynton Beach. In 1998-99 the building underwent a $14 million restoration funded by the City of Boynton Beach and the Florida Division of Historical Resources of the Florida Department of State.

A historical marker was erected in 2008.

The museum
Since 2001 the former school is the home of the Schoolhouse Children's Museum & Learning Center.
"Its mission is to encourage families to learn the history of Boynton Beach and Palm Beach County through interactive exhibitions and programs." It features hands-on, interactive exhibits about history, maritime history, marine life, local and regional history, and period home, general store, and school life displays. "Our exhibits provide an interactive glimpse of life for early Florida Pioneers – before the days of computers, cell phones, televisions or even cars."

References

External links
 Schoolhouse Children's Museum - official Web site
 Palm Beach County listings at National Register of Historic Places
 Florida's Office of Cultural and Historical Programs
 Palm Beach County listings
 Boynton School
 Timeline of Schools in Boynton Beach
 Boynton gets historic marker for Schoolhouse Children's Museum

National Register of Historic Places in Palm Beach County, Florida
Children's museums in Florida
Museums in Boynton Beach, Florida
2001 establishments in Florida